National Intellectual Property Rights Policy was approved by the Indian cabinet on 12 May 2016 to ensure compliance to the Doha Development Round and TRIPS Agreement. With its seven objectives, it aims at creating a "“Creative India; Innovative India".

References

Intellectual property law in Asia
Indian intellectual property law